Orvar Bergmark (16 November 1930 – 10 May 2004) was a Swedish football defender, manager and bandy player. He was the second Swedish national manager ever, and managed to qualify the Swedish national football team for the FIFA World Cup in Mexico 1970, after having beaten France (among others) in the qualifications. The 1970 World Cup was the first one for Sweden in 12 years, and it was also the first time in 20 years that Sweden had qualified for a World Cup. (Sweden hosted the 1958 FIFA World Cup, and hence did not need to qualify. Bergmark was a player for Sweden that year.) Sweden did not qualify for the World Cups in 1954, 1962 and 1966). In 1952 he took part in the Olympic Bandy tournament.

In Mexico, Sweden had to face the becoming runners-up, Italy, in their first game, and lost 0–1. The Italian squad included Roberto Boninsegna, Gianni Rivera, Luigi Riva, Giacinto Facchetti and Dino Zoff. In the second game, Israel did not seem too difficult to beat. But Sweden got a 1–1 draw. Then Sweden needed to beat Uruguay in the last group game with at least two goals. Orvar Bergmark's squad only scored a single goal (in the last minute), and it all was over. Some of Orvar Bergmark's key players were Ove Grahn, Ove Kindvall, Hasse Selander, Tommy Svensson (who 24 years later would keep Orvars Bergmark's office, and led Sweden to a surprising bronze medal in the 1994 World Cup in the United States), Bosse Larsson and Roland Grip.

During the tournament, Sweden had a goal-keeping problem. Bergmark used the young Ronnie Hellström in the opening game against Italy, and was displeased with Hellström's performance when Italy scored. The little less talented, but far more experienced Sven-Gunnar Larsson guarded the Swedish goal during the last two matches instead.

Orvar Bergmark left his office soon after the World Cup and was replaced by Georg "Åby" Ericson.

Bergmark was not only a football player who won silver medals at the 1958 FIFA World Cup. He was also an international bandy player, and won silver medals at that sport's World Cup also. He played his bandy for Örebro SK.

In 1980, he organized the first international tournament for bandy ladies. In Örebro, Sweden met Finland, Norway and the Netherlands, and took the first prize.

Bergmark contracted Parkinson's disease around 1980, and died from it in 2004.

Honours

Player

Sweden
FIFA World Cup: runner-up 1958

Individual
Guldbollen: 1958
World Soccer World XI: 1960, 1961

References

External links
 «Boken om 500 AIK:are» aik.se
 Hall of Fame
 

1930 births
2004 deaths
People from Skellefteå Municipality
Allsvenskan players
Serie A players
Örebro SK players
AIK Fotboll players
A.S. Roma players
Expatriate footballers in Italy
Swedish expatriate sportspeople in Italy
1958 FIFA World Cup players
1970 FIFA World Cup managers
Sweden international footballers
Sweden national football team managers
Örebro SK managers
Swedish football managers
Swedish footballers
Swedish bandy players
Örebro SK Bandy players
Association football defenders
Winter Olympics competitors for Sweden
Bandy players at the 1952 Winter Olympics
Medalists at the 1952 Winter Olympics
Swedish expatriate footballers
Sportspeople from Västerbotten County